The Namibian National Time Trial Championship is a cycling race where the Namibian cyclists decide who will become the champion for the year to come. The winners of each event are awarded with a symbolic cycling jersey, just like the national flag, these colors can be worn by the rider at other road racing events in the country to show their status as national champion. The champion's stripes can be combined into a sponsored rider's team kit design for this purpose.

Men

Elite

Women

Elite

See also
Namibian National Road Race Championships
National road cycling championships

References

National road cycling championships
Cycle races in Namibia
Recurring sporting events established in 2007